The Maratha Resurrection was the period between the Third Battle of Panipat on January 14, 1761 and capture of Najibabad in 1772.

In the Third Battle of Panipat, the Maratha Empire suffered a serious blow at the hands of the Muslim alliance of the Durrani Empire, Mughal Empire, under Prince Ali Gohar later known as (Shah Alam II) (r. 17601806)and his Nawab of Awadh, and Rohillas under Najib ad-Dawlah. Their power was virtually wiped out of northern India and the confederacy itself experienced fragmentation. The Bhonsles of Nagpur did not participate and tried to remain aloof of the aftermath as well.

After the death of Peshwa Balaji Baji Rao Bhat, Madhavrao I became Peshwa under the regency of Raghunathrao Bhat. Despite quarrels with Raghunathrao, the young Peshwa, along with Mahadji Shinde and Nana Fadnavis, were able to resurrect Maratha supremacy, both in Deccan and Delhi.

Madhavrao Peshwa's victory over the Nizam of Hyderabad and Hyder Ali of Mysore in southern India proved Maratha dominance in the Deccan. On the other hand, Mahadji's victory over Jats of Mathura, Rajputs of Rajasthan and Pashtun-Rohillas of Rohilkhand (in the western part of present-day Uttar Pradesh state) re-established the Marathas in the northern India. With the Capture of Delhi in 1771 and the capture of Najibabad in 1772 and treatise with Mughal Emperor Shah Alam II as a restricted monarch to the throne under Maratha suzerainty, the resurrection of Maratha power in the North was complete.

References  

Maratha Empire